Maswik Lodge is a lodge in Grand Canyon National Park that is run by Xanterra Parks & Resorts. It is named after a Hopi Kachina figure said to watch over the Grand Canyon. It is on the west side of Grand Canyon Village. The lodge contains a cafeteria, lounge, and many spread out room complexes.

History
The lodge began in 1927 as a Fred Harvey hotel for drivers of their own automobiles (as opposed to most of the travelers who arrived on rail or stage coaches). In the 1940s, 20 new buildings were added along with moving 22 buildings from Bright Angel Lodge. Most of the original buildings were removed in 1971 and replaced with a more modern motel structure. In 2018, the park considered demolishing all of the existing buildings.

Fodor's review of the lodge noted pros: "well-equipped northern unites, good for families, and affordable dining." Fodor's review noted cons of: "rooms lack historic charm, tucked away from the rim in the forest, and south units don't have air conditioning."

References

External links 
 Grand Canyon website
 Maswik Lodge website

Grand Canyon
Buildings and structures in Coconino County, Arizona
Buildings and structures in Grand Canyon National Park
1927 establishments in Arizona